Stadionul Naţional de Rugby Arcul de Triumf (Triumphal Arch National Rugby Stadium) was a multi-purpose stadium in Bucharest, Romania. It was used mostly for rugby games and named after the triumphal arch in Bucharest.

The stadium was demolished and replaced with the new Stadionul Arcul de Triumf.

The stadium was steeped in Romanian rugby history. It was located on the former site of the Federaţiei playing fields, where the sport was introduced to the country in the early 20th century.

Between 2008 and 2013, the stadium was renovated and expanded to 7,500 seats with the help of Sector's 1 City Hall.

Music

Concerts

References

Rugby union stadiums in Romania
Sports venues in Bucharest
Defunct rugby union venues
Sports venues completed in 1914
1914 establishments in Romania
Multi-purpose stadiums in Romania
Music venues in Romania